Sam Masich (born February 7, 1962) is a taijiquan instructor, performing songwriter and filmmaker residing in Vancouver, British Columbia, Canada and Berlin, Germany.

Biography

Masich was born February 7, 1962, in Prince George, British Columbia, Canada. He began his career with an intensive apprenticeship in taijiquan and judo at age 18 with Brien Gallagher in Burnaby, BC. By age twenty, he was teaching in community centres in Vancouver BC and in 1985 was selected to Canada's national Chinese martial arts team to compete in the 1st World Wushu Invitational tournament in Xian, China.  During the 1980s, Masich gained a reputation as a top taijiquan/neijiaquan competitor. He currently resides in Berlin, Germany.

During the 1980s and 1990s, Masich became a formal disciple of Yang Jwing Ming and Liang Shouyu.  As well he furthered his studies with Yang Zhen Duo, Chen Xiaowang and Jou Tsung Hwa. During this time he began teaching workshops and seminars in his native Canada and elsewhere. He created the "5 Section Taijiquan Program" and has published articles and films on taijiquan (T'ai chi ch'uan, taijijian, pushing hands), Xingyiquan, Baguazhang and other subjects.

From the 1990s, while continuing his research and teaching in the field of Neijiaquan, Masich began a parallel career as a performing songwriter and recording artist, working primarily with Christine Duncan and Michael Friedman and in collaboration with Michael Creber, Miles Black and others.

Other endeavours have included stints as a film and television special skills trainer and choreographer (see Black Sash (TV series)), workshop facilitator for professional actors and martial arts instructional-film maker. He is the subject of two internationally airing documentaries including Quiet Places: A Tai Chi Retreat by Omni Films.

Works

Discography

Internal Arts filmography

Notes

Documentaries on Sam Masich
The Ancient Arts of Tai Chi and Qigong (Osiris Films 1998)
Quiet Places—A Tai Chi Retreat (OMNI Films 1999)

External links
 Sam Masich official website
 Sam Masich Internal Arts 馬希奇内家拳 on FaceBook
 Sam Masich (music) on FaceBook

Further reading
 Wei, Yang (2008), In the Spirit of the 2008 Olympics: Extraordinary Chinese Martial Artists of the World, Hong Kong, China: World Culture Exchange Publishing House (featured martial artist)
 Liang, Shou-Yu & Wu, Wen-Ching. Kung Fu Elements; Wushu Training and Applications Manual. pp. 372, 423, 444, 445  (featured martial artist)
 Dr. Yang Jwing Ming and Bolt, Jeffery. Northern Shaolin Sword. (Foreword by Sam Masich) 
 Master Liang Shou-yu, Dr. Yang Jwing-ming, Mr. Wu Wen-ching Ermei Baguazhang (martial art photo assistant) 
 Master Liang Shou-yu, Dr. Yang Jwing-ming. Xingyiquan (martial art photo assistant) 
 Babin, Michael. Yang-style Taiji. p. 328 
 Sam Masich: Taiji biography
 Sam Masich: music biography
• Secrets of the Qigong Masters: Interview with Sam Masich

1962 births
Canadian tai chi practitioners
Canadian songwriters
Canadian expatriates in Germany
Living people
People from Prince George, British Columbia